is a dam in Okayama Prefecture, Japan. It is located on the border between the cities of Maniwa and Niimi, and it is actually situated between the eastbound and westbound lanes of the Chūgoku Expressway. The dam was completed in 1980.

References 

Dams in Okayama Prefecture
Dams completed in 1980